Snapple is a brand of tea and juice drinks which is owned by Keurig Dr Pepper and based in Plano, Texas, United States. The company (and brand), which was originally known as Unadulterated Food Products, was founded in 1972. The brand achieved some fame due to various pop-culture references including television shows.

History
Snapple was founded by Leonard Marsh, Hyman Golden, and Arnold Greenberg in 1972  Valley Stream, Long Island, New York. Their company, which was originally known as Unadulterated Food Products, was first conceived as a part-time venture to supply fruit juices to health food stores. Unsure if the business would succeed, Greenberg continued to run his health food store in Manhattan's East Village, while Leonard Marsh and his brother-in-law, Hyman Golden, operated a window washing business. In a 1989 interview with Crain's New York Business, Marsh admitted that when they launched the small business he knew "as much about juice as about making an atom bomb."

An early apple juice product led to the company's name, Snapple. Golden, Greenberg and Marsh had created a carbonated apple juice. One of the batches of apple juice fermented in the bottle, causing the bottle caps to fly off. The original name of that particular apple juice product, "Snapple," a portmanteau derived from the words "snappy" and "apple," became the new name for their beverage company.   

The Snapple Beverage Corporation was born, beginning in the early 1980s. Snapple would not manufacture their first tea, lemon tea, until 1987.

Currently, there are many  different types of Snapple: Tea (multiple flavors, such as lemon, raspberry, and peach, all of which come in original and diet), juice drinks, lemonade, and bottled water. Snapple is also bottled in the form of an aluminum can.

Snapple's brand slogan is "Made from the Best Stuff on Earth."

Snapple was known for a popular series of TV advertisements in the early 1990s featuring Wendy Kaufman (the "Snapple Lady") answering letters from Snapple fans.  In an effort to counteract the Coke and Pepsi challenge commercials, Snapple began running a new line of advertisements in May 1992, which featured its trademark “made from the best stuff on Earth” line in ads that spoofed earlier beer and sports drinks promotions; the ads received low marks from advertising industry observers. In addition, the company used its $15-million-a-year advertising budget to pay for a long-lived series of live radio commercials featuring controversial disk jockeys Howard Stern and Rush Limbaugh. At the end of the summer of 1992, Snapple conducted a five-week search for a new advertising agency that could better convey its corporate identity in preparation for a wider national push. Later that year, Snapple also signed tennis player Jennifer Capriati to endorse its products.  By August 1992, Snapple had expanded its distribution to every major city in the United States and it signed new contracts with beverage distributors. The company owned no manufacturing facilities, but instead made agreements with more than 30 bottlers across the country. In this way, Snapple was able to keep its overhead low and its payroll short. The company administration consisted of just 80 employees, 50 of whom worked out of a modest office building on Long Island.

Thomas H. Lee, an American businessperson, financier and investor of Thomas H. Lee Partners (THL) acquired Snapple Beverages in 1992 on undisclosed terms. The three founders of Snapple, Leonard Marsh, Hyman Golden and Arnold Greenberg, said they would own about one-third of the new company and be involved in its management. Hellen Berry, vice president of the Beverage Marketing Corporation, a consultant in New York, estimated that Snapple, which had been for sale for more than a year and had $100 million in sales in 1991, sold for $140 million. Only eight months after buying the company, Lee took Snapple Beverages public and in 1994, only two years after the original acquisition, Lee sold the company to the Quaker Oats Company for $1.7 billion.  Lee was estimated to have made $900 million for himself and his investors from the sale. The company ran into problems and sold it to Triarc in 1997 for $300 million. Triarc sold it to Cadbury Schweppes for $1.45 billion in September 2000. It was spun off in May 2008 to its current owners.

Lawsuits
In 2009, a consumer lawsuit was brought against Snapple in California. The suit alleged the drinks contained unhealthy ingredients such as high fructose corn syrup and deceptive names on labels that lead consumers to believe that certain healthy elements are in the drinks that are not really present.

In 2010, in a lawsuit against Snapple in the federal District of New Jersey, the court certified to the FDA for an administrative determination the question whether high fructose corn syrup (HFCS) qualifies as a "natural" ingredient. In 2010, the FDA responded by letter and declined to provide the court with the requested guidance. Stating that it would take two to three years to engage in a transparent proceeding to elicit the proper public participation, the FDA again cited its limited resources and more pressing food-safety concerns.

In 2011, a New York federal court dismissed a different lawsuit accusing Snapple of misleading consumers by labeling drinks sweetened with high fructose corn syrup as "all natural." The court found that the plaintiffs had failed to show that they were injured as a result of Snapple's labeling.

After the lawsuit in May 2009, Snapple was made with sugar, not high fructose corn syrup. However, in certain areas, the older formula is still sold in stores, but this is becoming increasingly rare.

Snapple and New York City schools
In October 2003, Snapple began its sponsorship of the New York City public school system (and other parcels in the area), as part of the deal to make Snapple New York City's official beverage. The company promised an $8 million per year profit for city schools if it were allowed to sell its drinks, including juice and bottled water, in school vending machines.

Snapple was able to acquire the contract in part because New York City officials did not want to encourage the consumption of sodas, which have been linked to childhood obesity and diabetes and are generally considered unhealthy. The Snapple juice drinks, specifically created to meet rules banning soda and other sugary snacks from city schools, are marketed under the "Snapple 100% Juiced!" label. The flavors available under this brand include Green Apple, Fruit Punch, Melon Berry, Grape, Orange Mango, and Strawberry Lime. Although the juice drinks are fortified with vitamins and minerals, a 16-ounce bottle contains more sugar (41 grams) than a 12-ounce can of Coca-Cola (39 grams).

Dr. Michael F. Jacobson, the executive director of the Center for Science in the Public Interest, called the drinks "little better than vitamin-fortified sugar water." In addition, the concentrates used in the drinks, apple, grape and pear, are the least expensive and nutritious. Dr. Toni Liquori, associate professor at the Columbia Teachers College, questioned the sale of bottled water in schools, saying "If anything, we should have cold water in our schools."

The deal also gave Snapple exclusive rights to sell its tea and juice-based drinks in vending machines on all New York City properties starting in January 2004. Snapple paid the City $106 million for the rights and agreed to spend $60 million more to marketing and promotion over the length of the five-year contract.

Rumors and myths
In the early 1990s, the original label graphic on the Iced Tea flavor, a depiction of the United States historical event the Boston Tea Party, was replaced due to misinformation espoused by protest groups claiming the ships on the packaging were slave trading vessels in New York Harbor. Snapple also fell victim to a rumor that the small "K" was either a representation of the Klan, or of an imagined "Jewish Tax" (augmented by the fact that all three founders were Jewish). The "K" on the products actually meant that they were certified kosher.  There were also rumors that the company donated to the controversial pro-life organization Operation Rescue.

Snapple initially tried to quell these rumors quietly, but ultimately had to launch a media campaign to squash them, pointing out it would be bad for business to support controversial issues in such a way as the rumors implied. Through a media campaign with the NAACP, Snapple successfully fought back these rumors, although occasionally they are still brought up as fact.

"Real Facts"
Snapple is well known for printing interesting numbered List of Snapple "Real Fact" facts on the inside of their bottle caps. A list of these "Real Facts" are available on the company website.

Disputed facts
Several of the facts on Snapple caps have been found to be outdated, incorrect or exaggerated.

Popular culture

Snapple was the official beverage sponsor of America's Got Talent from season 7 to season 9 of the NBC show (Howard Stern, one of the judges on the show, was a spokesperson for Snapple in the 1980s). It was replaced by Dunkin' for season 10.

Snapple Theater Center
In 2007, Snapple opened the Snapple Theater Center on 50th Street and Broadway in the heart of New York City's Theater District. It has two theaters, one of which is a traditional theater, the other a thrust stage which can house plays. The center also includes a 40×50 ft rehearsal space which is available for rent. The theaters are considered off-Broadway because of their low seating capacities. The theater has since dropped the "Snapple" name and sponsorship and is purely known as "The Theater Center."

Kosher certification 
Most Snapple drinks do have a Kosher certification from the OK Kosher Agency. Exceptions include:
 Fruit Punch
 Grape
 Kiwi Lemon-lime

See also

Kick (soft drink)

References

External links
Official website
Snapple Refreshes Itself – Snapple Relaunch (2009)
The Snapple Dragoon at Snopes.com

Iced tea brands
Tea brands in the United States
Keurig Dr Pepper brands
Private equity portfolio companies
Products introduced in 1972
Juice brands
American drinks
1994 mergers and acquisitions
2000 mergers and acquisitions
Food and drink companies based in Texas